Amiruddin Bagas Kaffa Arrizqi (born 16 January 2002) is an Indonesian professional footballer who plays as a right-back for Liga 1 club PS Barito Putera.

Club career

Barito Putera
Bagas Kaffa made his first-team debut on 6 March 2020 as a starting in a match against Bali United. This season was suspended on 27 March 2020 due to the COVID-19 pandemic. The season was abandoned and was declared void on 20 January 2021.

Career statistics

Club

Notes

International goals

Indonesia U19

Personal life 
He is the twin brother of footballer Bagus Kahfi.

Honours

International 
Indonesia U-16
 Thien Phong Plastic Cup: 2017
 JENESYS Japan-ASEAN U-16 Youth Football Tournament: 2017
 AFF U-16 Youth Championship: 2018

Indonesia U-19
 AFF U-19 Youth Championship third place: 2019

Individual
 Liga 1 Young Player of the Month: September 2021, November 2021, February 2022
 Liga 1 Team of the Season: 2021–22

References

External links 
 Bagas Kaffa at AFC
 

2002 births
Living people
Indonesian footballers
PS Barito Putera players
Liga 1 (Indonesia) players
Indonesia youth international footballers
Association football defenders
People from Magelang
Sportspeople from Central Java
Indonesian twins
Twin sportspeople